TECH is a private international educational group that provides online education. The educational group was founded in 2015, starting its activity in Latin America, where it has its main university: TECH Mexico.

Nowadays, the educational group offers more than 8,000 different university courses in online/digital format.

History 
The TECH Education group was founded in 2015 by the Spanish company Tech Education Rights & Technologies SL, organized as an international cluster of private universities that  originally operated mainly in Spanish-speaking countries.

The institution initially offered courses focused on health sciences, and later expanded to technological sciences, social and business sciences.

In 2019, TECH Technological University Mexico was officially recognized as an institution of higher education, with the incorporation of the first Degrees, Master's Degrees and Doctorates.

In February 2019, TECH made a strategic agreement with Harvard Business Publishing,.

In 2022, the educational group started to offer classes in english.

In February 2022, TECH signs a multi-year agreement with the National Basketball Association (NBA),.

Academics 
At present, the educational group operates in Spanish and English-Speaking countries. The current student body is composed by more than 100,000 students from 112 different countries. Moreover, there are more than 500,000 graduates around the world.

The educational group is focused in postgraduate education. The study programs include Master's Degrees and Specialist Diplomas in collaboration with the CEU Cardinal Herrera University, located in Valencia (Spain), as well as continuing education programs in collaboration with Panamerican University (Mexico).

Rectorate

References

External links 

 Official website

Private universities and colleges in Mexico
Distance education institutions based in Mexico
2015 establishments